Ramón Mayeregger Galarza (also spelled Maggeregger) (born 5 March 1936) is a Paraguayan football goalkeeper who played for Paraguay in the 1958 FIFA World Cup. He also played for Club Nacional.

References

External links
FIFA profile

1936 births
Sportspeople from Asunción
Paraguayan footballers
Paraguay international footballers
Association football goalkeepers
Club Nacional footballers
1958 FIFA World Cup players
Living people